The Belogorsk Lion Safari-Park Taigan (Белогорський сафарі-парк львів «Тайган») is a safari park in the Belogorsk Region of Crimea.

History
In 2006, businessman Oleg Zubkov, already the owner of the  "Fairy Tale", purchased real estate on the grounds of a former military institution (НИИ систем связи и управления центрального научно-производственного объединения «Каскад»). As a result of the conflict, in 2015 the park was closed for visitors, but it reopened in April 2016. In 2019, the court banned the "Walk with the Lions" safari trail.

References

External links
 Official website
 Taigan Park Lions via YouTube

Zoos in Crimea